Tower raven or variation, may refer to:

 Ravens of the Tower of London, a group of ravens that live in the Tower of London (The Tower)
 The Raven Tower (2019 novel), by Ann Leckie
 The Tower of Ravens (2004 novel) in the Rhiannon's Ride series by Kate Forsyth

See also
 Tower (disambiguation)
 Raven (disambiguation)